Western Motel is a 1957 oil painting by the American Realist artist Edward Hopper. The work depicts a sunlight, open-plan hotel room; the painting is noted for its elegant simplicity and subtle sense of foreboding.

References

Paintings by Edward Hopper